This is a list of airports in Bhutan, sorted by location.

Bhutan, officially the Kingdom of Bhutan, is a landlocked country in South Asia, located at the eastern end of the Himalaya Mountains and bordered to the south, east and west by the Republic of India and to the north by Tibet. Bhutan was separated from the nearby state of Nepal to the west by the Indian state of Sikkim, and from Bangladesh to the south by West Bengal. The capital city is Thimphu.

Airports 

Airport names shown in bold have scheduled passenger service on commercial airlines.

Bagdogra Airport in neighbouring India is also accessible for flights to Bhutan.

See also 

 Transport in Bhutan
 List of airports by ICAO code: V

References 

 
 
 Airports in Bhutan World Aero Data
 Airports in Bhutan Great Circle Mapper
 Airports in Bhutan FallingRain.com

 
Bhutan
Airports
Airports
Bhutan